The Boni National Reserve is a national reserve for conservation and lies in the Garissa County, Kenya. It was gazetted in 1976 as a dry season sanctuary for elephants in the former Kenyan Ijara, and Lamu districts and Somalia. The elephant population has been greatly reduced by poaching.

On December 28, 2010, the U.S. Department of State Bureau of Consular Affairs included the Boni National Reserve on the list of Kenyan areas American travelers should avoid because of terrorism and violent crime.

Vegetation 
The Boni forest, after which the reserve is named, is an indigenous open canopy forest and part of the Northern Zanzibar-Inhambane coastal forest mosaic. . Harbouring densities of plant species that are among the highest in the world, the forest has been declared a biodiversity hotspot.

Wildlife 
Common herbivores in the region include hippopotamus, bushpig, warthog, buffalo, common duiker, topi and waterbuck. Common carnivores in the reserve are the vulnerable African wild dog and the aardwolf. Although extremely rare, African elephants are also present in the reserve.

Birds 
As part of the East African coastal forest, it is likely to hold bird species characteristic of the coastal forests of eastern Africa, possibly including globally threatened species such as Sokoke pipit.

Al Shabaab Hide-out 
The government of Kenya believes that Boni National Reserve has become a hide-out for the Al Shabaab, a terrorist organization based in Somalia  This has led to several armed incursions into the reserve by the Kenya Defence Force and Kenya Police. In early 2017, US troops were reportedly giving Kenya assistance in attempts to remove Al Shabaab from the reserve .

Further reading 
 Githiru, M. et al. (2007) Density, distribution and habitat use by large mammals in Boni National Reserve and the neighbouring Northern Buffer Zone, NE Kenya. National Museums of Kenya.
 Antipa, R. S, Ali, M. H. and Hussein, A. A. (2007) Assessment of the Potential of Eco/Cultural Tourism as Viable Enterprises in Southern Garissa, Ijara and Lamu Districts: A Community Conservation and Enterprise Support Initiative. National Environmental Management Authority of Kenya.
 Antipa, R. S, Ali, M. H. and Hussein, A. A. (2007) Preservation and Maintenance of Biological Diversity Related Knowledge of Indigenous Diversity and Local Communities with Traditional Lifestyles Boni Forest, Ijara District. National Environmental Management Authority of Kenya.

References

External links 
 National Museums of Kenya
 National Environmental Management Authority of Kenya
 The Encyclopaedia of Earth: Northern Zanzibar Inhambane coastal forest mosaic
 Biodiversity Hotspots: Coast Forests of Eastern Africa
 Kenya Wildlife Service

National parks of Kenya
Protected areas established in 1976
Garissa County
1976 establishments in Kenya
Northern Zanzibar–Inhambane coastal forest mosaic